This is a list of finalists for the 1946 Archibald Prize for portraiture. (listed is Artist – Title) As the images are copyright, an external link to an image has been listed where available.

See also 
Previous year: List of Archibald Prize 1945 finalists
Next year: List of Archibald Prize 1947 finalists
List of Archibald Prize winners
Lists of Archibald Prize finalists

References

1946
Archibald
Archibald
Archibald Prize 1946
Archibald Prize 1946